Arndt or Arnd is a German masculine given name, a short form of Arnold, as well as a German patronymic surname. Notable people with the name include:

Given name 
Arndt Bause (1936–2003), German composer of popular songs
Arndt von Bohlen und Halbach (1938–1986), German heir
Arnd Goldschmidt (born 1981), German flatwater canoer
Arndt Jorgens (1905–1980), American baseball catcher
Arndt Kaspar (born 1962), German sport shooter
Arnd Klawitter (born 1968), German actor
Arndt Kohn (born 1980), German politician
Arnd Krüger (born 1944), German sports historian
Arnd Meier (born 1973), German racecar driver
Arnd Meißl (born 1968), Austrian politician
Arndt Norrgård (born 1942), Finnish sports sailor
Arnd Peiffer (born 1987), German biathlete
Arndt Pekurinen (1905–1941), Finnish pacifist and conscientious objector
Arnd Scheel (born 1966), German mathematician
Arnd Schmitt (born 1965), German fencer

Surname 
 Adolf Arndt (1904–1974), German politician
 Alfred Arndt (1896–1976), German architect
 Al Arndt (1911–1969), American football player
 Bettina Arndt (born 1949), Australian sex therapist
 Charles C. P. Arndt (1811–1842), American politician
 Charles Arndt (born c. 1967), United States soccer goalkeeper
 Chip Arndt (born 1966), American reality show contestant
 Danny Arndt (born 1955), Canadian ice hockey player
 Dick Arndt (born 1944), American football player
 Eric Arndt (born 1986), American wrestler, better known as Enzo Amore
 Ernst Moritz Arndt (1769–1860), German author/poet
 Ernst Arndt (1861 – c. 1942), German/Austrian actor
 Fabian Arndt (born 1995), German footballer 
 Felix Arndt (1889–1918), American pianist & composer
 Fred Arndt (1917–2002), American basketball player
 Fritz Arndt (1885–1969), German chemist
 Fritz Arndt, (1910–2003), German Oberfeldwebel
 Gary Arndt (born 1969), American travel photographer & writer
 Gertrud Arndt (1903–2000), German art photographer
 Harry Arndt (1879–1921), American baseball player
 Heinz Arndt (1915–2002), Australian economist
 Ingrid Arndt-Brauer (born 1961), German politician (SPD)
 Jirka Arndt (born 1973), German Olympic long-distance runner
 Joe Arndt, American organist
 Johann Arndt (1555–1621), German theologian
 John Penn Arndt (1780–1861), American politician
 Judith Arndt (born 1976), German cyclist
 Jürgen Arndt, German rower
 Karl M. Arndt (1901–1956), American economist
 Michael Arndt, American screenwriter
 Paweł Arndt (born 1954), Polish politician
 Rudolf Arndt (1835–1900), German psychiatrist
 Stefan Arndt (born 1961), German film producer
 Walther Arndt (1891–1944), German zoologist/physician
 Walter W. Arndt (1916–2011), American professor

See also
 Arndt Lake, California
 Arndt Verlag, German book publisher
 Arndt-Schulz rule
 Arndt-Eistert synthesis
 Arend (given name)
 Arend (surname)
 Arendt (surname)
 Arent (given name)
 Arent (surname)

References 

German masculine given names
German-language surnames